Protein tyrosine phosphatase non-receptor type 5 is an enzyme that in humans is encoded by the PTPN5 gene.

Protein tyrosine phosphatase (PTP), non-receptor type 5, also known as STEP (STriatal-Enriched protein tyrosine Phosphatase), was the first brain-specific PTP discovered. The human STEP locus maps to chromosome 11p15.2-p15.1 and the murine STEP gene to chromosome 7B3-B5. The single STEP gene is alternatively spliced to produce several isoforms, the best characterized of which are the cytosolic STEP46 protein and the membrane-associated STEP61 protein.

Substrates 

Seven known targets of STEP have been identified as of 2015, including ERK1/2, p38, Fyn, Pyk2, PTPα, and the glutamate receptor subunits GluN2B and GluA2. STEP dephosphorylation of the kinases (ERK1/2, p38, Fyn, and Pyk2) occurs at a regulatory tyrosine within the kinase activation loop and leads to their inactivation. Dephosphorylation of a regulatory tyrosine on PTPα prevents the translocation of PTPα from the cytosol to lipid rafts, where it normally activates Fyn. STEP thereby directly inactivates Fyn and also prevents the translocation of PTPα to compartments where it activates Fyn. STEP dephosphorylation of GluN2B and GluA2 leads to the internalization of NMDARs (GluN1/GluN2B) and AMPARs (GluA1/GluA2). Thus, one function of STEP is to oppose synaptic strengthening by inactivating kinases and internalizing receptors that are critical for the development of synaptic strengthening.

Clinical significance 

STEP levels are disrupted in several diseases. Alzheimer’s disease (AD) was the first illness to be associated with elevated STEP expression both in human cortex and in several mouse models of AD. STEP is also increased in fragile X syndrome, schizophrenia, and Parkinson’s disease. In AD and FXS mouse models, genetic reduction of STEP expression reverses many of the cognitive and behavioral deficits.
Other laboratories have now shown that STEP activity is also reduced in several additional disorders. Thus, STEP levels or activity is decreased in Huntington’s disease, cerebral ischemia, alcohol abuse, and stress disorders. The emergent model suggests that an optimal level of STEP is required at synaptic sites, and that both high and low levels disrupt synaptic function.

Inhibition 

Several STEP inhibitors have now been discovered. GlaxoSmithKline chose STEP as a new project for their Discovery Partnerships with Academia (DPAc) in 2014. This is a relatively new program in drug discovery and brings together the academic world with the drug discovery expertise of GSK to discover new inhibitors of validated targets.

 TC-2153

References

Further reading